Eastern Wayne High School (EWHS) is a public high school located in Goldsboro, Wayne County, North Carolina, United States. It opened in 1969.

It is classified as a 3-A school with enrollment estimated at 1100 students. The school mascot is the Warrior, and its colors are navy blue and gold.

The school received a Silver Medal designation in U.S. News & World Reports "America’s Best High Schools" rankings, and had a graduation rate of 91.1%. In 2010, it was awarded the National Award for School Lunch for having the best high school lunch in America.

Athletics
Eastern Wayne is a 3-A school in the North Carolina High School Athletic Association (NCHSAA). Sports offered include cross country, football, golf, soccer, tennis, women's volleyball, basketball, swimming, wrestling, baseball, softball, track & field, and cheerleading.

Notable alumni
 Jimmy Graham, NFL tight end and 5x Pro Bowl selection
 Manny Lawson, former NFL linebacker from 2006 to 2015
 Sam Narron, former MLB pitcher

References

Public high schools in North Carolina
Schools in Wayne County, North Carolina